Guy Forget was the defending champion but did not compete that year.

Thomas Enqvist won the final 6–4, 1–0 after Marcelo Ríos was forced to retire.

Seeds

  Marcelo Ríos (final, retired)
  Thomas Enqvist (champion)
  Michael Stich (first round)
  Marc Rosset (quarterfinals)
  Cédric Pioline (first round)
  Petr Korda (second round)
  Francisco Clavet (first round)
  Hendrik Dreekmann (quarterfinals)

Draw

Finals

Top half

Bottom half

External links
 Main Draw on ATP Archive

Open 13
1997 ATP Tour